This section of the Timeline of United States history concerns events from 1820 to 1859.

1820s

Presidency of James Monroe

1820 – Massachusetts divided in two with the admission of Maine as a state.
1820 – U.S. presidential election, 1820: James Monroe reelected president unopposed, Daniel D. Tompkins reelected vice president.
1821 – President Monroe and Vice President Tompkins begin second terms as president
1821 – Missouri becomes a state
1821 – Florida becomes a U.S. territory; the 1819 Adams–Onís Treaty goes into effect
1823 – Monroe Doctrine proclaimed
1824 – Gibbons v. Ogden (22 US 1 1824) affirms federal over state authority in interstate commerce. Gibbons' business partner is Cornelius Vanderbilt.
1824 – U.S. presidential election, 1824: Presidential results inconclusive. John C. Calhoun elected the vice president.
1825 – John Quincy Adams elected president by the House of Representatives;

Presidency of John Quincy Adams
1825 – Adams becomes the sixth President; John C. Calhoun, Vice President
1825 – Erie Canal is finally completed
1826 – Former presidents Thomas Jefferson and John Adams die on the same day, which happens to be on the fiftieth anniversary of the approval of the Declaration of independence. 
1828 – U.S. presidential election, 1828: Andrew Jackson elected president; John C. Calhoun reelected vice president
December 22, 1828 - First Lady-designate Rachel Jackson dies of a heart attack.

Presidency of Andrew Jackson
1829 – Andrew Jackson becomes the 7th President; Vice President Calhoun begins second term

1830s

1830s – Second Great Awakening is the religious revival movement
1830s – Oregon Trail which comes into use by settlers migrating to the Pacific Northwest
1830 – Indian Removal Act
1831 – Nat Turner's revolt
1831 – The Liberator begins publication in 1831
1831 – Cyrus McCormick invents the mechanical reaper
1831 – Petticoat affair (also known as the Eaton affair)
1832 – Worcester v. State of Georgia the Supreme Court rules in favor of Cherokees; President Jackson ignores the ruling
1832 – Maria Stewart is the first black American woman to give speech in front of a mixed audience
1832 – Black Hawk War
1832 – Tariff of 1832
1832 – Ordinance of Nullification passed by South Carolina
1832 – Department of Indian Affairs establishedrw.nklyi
1832 – 1832 United States presidential election: Andrew Jackson reelected president; Martin Van Buren elected vice president
1832 – Jackson vetoes the charter renewal of the Second Bank of the United States, bringing to a head the Bank War and ultimately leading to the Panic of 1837
1832 – John C. Calhoun resigns as vice president
1833 – The Force Bill expands presidential powers
1833 – President Jackson begins second term; Martin Van Buren becomes Vice President
1834 – Slavery debates at Lane Theological Seminary are one of the first major public discussions of the topic
1835 – Mexican President Santa Anna annuls the 1824 constitution, precipitating a civil war which spawns the Texas War for Independence.
1835 – Alexis de Tocqueville's Democracy in America published
1835 – Second Seminole War begins in Florida as members of the Seminole tribe resist relocation
1836 – Mexican President Santa Anna's army defeats Texas rebels at Battle of the Alamo
1836 - Battle of Goliad
1836 - Santa Anna deposed after losing the Battle of San Jacinto and recognizing Texan independence.
1836 – Creek War of 1836
1836 – Samuel Colt invents the revolver
1836 – Original "gag rule" imposed when U.S. House of Representatives bars discussion of antislavery petitions
1836 – Specie Circular issued
1836 – Arkansas becomes a state
1836 - Texas is the Lone Star Republic
1836 – U.S. presidential election, 1836: Martin Van Buren elected president, no one is elected vice president. 
1837 - Richard M. Johnson elected vice president by the Senate.

Presidency of Martin Van Buren
1837 – Van Buren becomes the eighth President; Johnson, Vice President
1837 – U.S. recognizes the Republic of Texas
1837 – Caroline affair
1837 – Michigan becomes a state
1837 – Oberlin College begins enrolling female students, becoming first coeducational college in the U.S.
1837 – Panic of 1837
1837 – Charles River Bridge v. Warren Bridge reverses Dartmouth College v. Woodward: property rights can be overridden by public eyed
1838 – Forced removal of the Cherokee Nation from the southeastern U.S. leads to over 4,000 deaths in the Trail of Tears
1838 – Aroostook War
1839 – Amistad case

1840s

1840 – 1840 United States presidential election: William Henry Harrison is elected president; John Tyler is elected vice president
1841 – John Quincy Adams argues the Amistad Case before the Supreme Court

Presidency of William Henry Harrison
March 4 – Harrison becomes the ninth President; John Tyler, Vice President
March 6 - Supreme Court finds for Amistad defendants. Freeing them.
April 4 – Harrison dies after only a month in office

Presidency of John Tyler
April 6, 1841 - Vice President Tyler becomes the tenth President
September 11, 1841 - Harrison's former cabinet resigns en masse. Only Daniel Webster remains. 
1842 – Webster–Ashburton Treaty
1842 – The Dorr Rebellion: A civil war in Rhode Island
1843 – Attempt to impeach President Tyler fails
1843 - Emigrants begin their  journey along the Oregon Trail.
1844 – Oregon  message
1844 – U.S. presidential election, 1844, James K. Polk is elected president; George M. Dallas is elected vice president
1845 – Texas annexation

Presidency of James K. Polk
1845 – Polk becomes the 11th President ; Dallas, Vice President
1845 – Florida and Texas become states
1846 – Dred Scott sues for his freedom
1846 – The Mexican–American War begins
1846 - Bear Flag revolt in Alta California, which is momentarily independent.
1846 – Iowa becomes a state
1846 – Wilmot Proviso
1846 - The United States and  Great Britain sign the  Oregon Treaty
1847 - Abraham Lincoln introduces himself to the world by his introduction of the Spot Resolutions in the House.
1847 - Battle of Buena Vista
1847 - Battle of Veracruz
1848 – The Treaty of Guadalupe Hidalgo ends the Mexican–American War
1848 – Wisconsin becomes a state
1848 – Seneca Falls Convention
1848 – U.S. presidential election, 1848; Zachary Taylor is elected president; Millard Fillmore is elected vice president

Presidency of Zachary Taylor
1849 – Taylor becomes the 12th President; Fillmore, Vice President
1849 – California Gold Rush begins

1850s 

1850 – Clayton–Bulwer Treaty
1850 – President Taylor threatens to veto Compromise of 1850 even if it means Civil War.
June 3–11 -The secessionist Nashville Convention held in Nashville, Tennessee.

Presidency of Millard Fillmore
July 9, 1850 – President Taylor dies, Vice President Fillmore becomes the 13th President
September 9–20, 1850 – The Compromise of 1850, including the notorious Fugitive Slave Act passed
September 9, 1850 – California becomes a state
November 1850 - Nashville Convention reconvenes; Satisfied with the Compromise, it declares the Union intact-for the moment.
1852 – U.S. presidential election, 1852: Franklin Pierce elected president; William R. King elected vice president
1853 – Commodore Matthew Perry opens Japan

Presidency of Franklin Pierce

1853 – Pierce becomes the 14th President; King, Vice President
1853 – Vice President King dies after only six weeks in office.
1854 – Gadsden Purchase from Mexico
1854 – Kansas–Nebraska Act; nullified Missouri Compromise
1854 – Ostend Manifesto
1854 – Whig Party collapses
1854 – Treaty of Kanagawa with Japan
1854 – Walker Expedition into Nicaragua
1854-1855 Know-Nothing Party, mushroom growth and sudden collapse
1855 – The Farmers' High School, which becomes Penn State University is founded.
1856 – Sack of Lawrence, Kansas
1856 – Pottawatomie massacre
1856 – Preston Brooks beats Charles Sumner with his walking stick on the steps of the U.S. Capitol building
1856 – U.S. presidential election, 1856: James Buchanan elected president; John C. Breckinridge, vice president

Presidency of James Buchanan
1857 – Buchanan becomes the 15th President; Breckinridge, Vice President
1857 – Dred Scott v. Sandford 60 US 393 1857 declares that slaves and blacks descended from slaves were not American citizens and cannot sue
1857 – Utah War
1857 – Lecompton Constitution rejected in Kansas Territory
1857 – Panic of 1857
1857 - San Francisco Board of Education established Minns Evening Normal School for current and prospective teachers, which becomes San Jose State University
1858 – Transatlantic cable laid
1858 – Minnesota becomes a state
1858 – Lincoln-Douglas Debates
1858 – U.S. is party to Treaty of Tientsin
1859 – John Brown's raid on Harpers Ferry
1859 – Comstock Lode discovered

See also
 History of the United States (1789–1849)
 History of the United States (1849–1865)
 Timeline of the American Old West

Further reading

General survey 

 Daniel Walker Howe. What Hath God Wrought: The Transformation of America, 1815–1848. Oxford History of the United States. New York: Oxford University Press, 2007. online
 Charles Sellers. The Market Revolution: Jacksonian America, 1815–1846. New York: Oxford University Press, 1991.

1820s
 John S. Galbraith. "British-American Competition in the Border Fur Trade of the 1820s". Minnesota History, Vol. 36, No. 7 (Sep., 1959), pp. 241–249.
 Robert Henry Billigmeier and Fred Altschuler Picard, eds. The old land and the new : the journals of two Swiss families in America in the 1820s. Minneapolis : University of Minnesota Press, 1965.
 Merrill D Peterson. Democracy, liberty and property; the State Constitutional Conventions of the 1820s. Indianapolis, Bobbs-Merrill Co., 1966.
 Robert A. McCaughey. "From Town to City: Boston in the 1820s". Political Science Quarterly, Vol. 88, No. 2 (Jun., 1973), pp. 191–213.
 James Brewer Stewart. "Evangelicalism and the Radical Strain in Southern Antislavery Thought During the 1820s". The Journal of Southern History, Vol. 39, No. 3 (Aug., 1973), pp. 379–396.
 Anne M. Boylan. "Sunday Schools and Changing Evangelical Views of Children in the 1820s". Church History Studies in Christianity and Culture, Vol. 48, No. 3 (Sep., 1979), pp. 320–333
 Priscilla Ferguson Clement. "The Philadelphia Welfare Crisis of the 1820s". The Pennsylvania Magazine of History and Biography, Vol. 105, No. 2 (Apr., 1981), pp. 150–165.
 Barbara Cloud. "Oregon in the 1820s: The Congressional Perspective". The Western Historical Quarterly, Vol. 12, No. 2 (Apr., 1981), pp. 145–164.
 David J Russo. Keepers of our past : local historical writing in the United States, 1820s-1830s. New York : Greenwood Press, 1988.
 James L. Huston. Virtue Besieged: Virtue, "Equality, and the General Welfare in the Tariff Debates of the 1820s". Journal of the Early Republic, Vol. 14, No. 4 (Winter, 1994), pp. 523–547
 George A. Thompson, Jr. "Counterfeiter's Jargon of the 1820s". American Speech, Vol. 71, No. 3 (Autumn, 1996), pp. 334–335.

1830s
 Miguel Guelbenzu. "Gest's Recollections of Life in the Middle West in the 1830s". Indiana Magazine of History, Vol. 73, No. 2 (June 1977), pp. 125–142.
 William R. Swagerty. "A View from the Bottom Up: The Work Force of the American Fur Company on the Upper Missouri in the 1830s". Montana: The Magazine of Western History, Vol. 43, No. 1, Fur Trade Issue (Winter, 1993), pp. 18–33.
 Curtis D. Johnson. "Supply-Side and Demand-Side Revivalism? Evaluating the Social Influences on New York State Evangelism in the 1830s". Social Science History, Vol. 19, No. 1 (Spring, 1995), pp. 1–30.
 Mary Hershberger. "Mobilizing Women, Anticipating Abolition: The Struggle against Indian Removal in the 1830s". The Journal of American History, Vol. 86, No. 1 (Jun., 1999), pp. 15–40
 Christine MacDonald. "Judging Jurisdictions: Geography and Race in Slave Law and Literature of the 1830s". American Literature, Vol. 71, No. 4 (Dec., 1999), pp. 625–655.

1840s
 Ralph Mann. "Mountains, Land, and Kin Networks: Burkes Garden, Virginia, in the 1840s and 1850s". The Journal of Southern History, Vol. 58, No. 3 (Aug., 1992), pp. 411–434.
 Harlan D. Parker. "The Musical Cabinet: An Educational Journal of the Boston Area in the 1840s". Bulletin of the Council for Research in Music Education, No. 116 (Spring, 1993), pp. 51–60.
 John W. Quist. "The Great Majority of Our Subscribers Are Farmers": The Michigan Abolitionist Constituency of the 1840s. Journal of the Early Republic, Vol. 14, No. 3 (Autumn, 1994), pp. 325–358. also
 Raymond L. Cohn. "Nativism and the End of the Mass Migration of the 1840s and 1850s". The Journal of Economic History, Vol. 60, No. 2 (Jun., 2000), pp. 361–383.
 Patricia Junker. Thomas Cole's "Prometheus Bound:" An Allegory for the 1840s. American Art Journal, Vol. 31, No. 1/2 (2000), pp. 32–55.
 Ronald J. Zboray, Mary Saracino Zboray. "Gender Slurs in Boston's Partisan Press during the 1840s". Journal of American Studies, Vol. 34, No. 3, Part 1: Living in America: Recent and Contemporary Perspectives (Dec., 2000), pp. 413–446.
 Alice Taylor. "From Petitions to Partyism: Antislavery and the Domestication of Maine Politics in the 1840s and 1850s". The New England Quarterly, Vol. 77, No. 1 (Mar., 2004), pp. 70–88.

1850s
 P. L. Rainwater. "Economic Benefits of Secession: Opinions in Mississippi in the 1850s". The Journal of Southern History, Vol. 1, No. 4 (Nov., 1935), pp. 459–474.
 Christopher Hatch. "Music for America: A Critical Controversy of the 1850s". American Quarterly, Vol. 14, No. 4 (Winter, 1962), pp. 578–586.
 William W. Chenault, Robert C. Reinders. "The Northern-born Community of New Orleans in the 1850s". The Journal of American History, Vol. 51, No. 2 (Sep., 1964), pp. 232–24.
 Howard H. Bell. "Negro Nationalism in the 1850s". The Journal of Negro Education, Vol. 35, No. 1 (Winter, 1966), pp. 100–104.
 Jane H. Pease, William H. Pease. "Confrontation and Abolition in the 1850s". The Journal of American History, Vol. 58, No. 4 (Mar., 1972), pp. 923–937.
 Howard I. Kushner. "Visions of the Northwest Coast: Gwin and Seward in the 1850s". The Western Historical Quarterly, Vol. 4, No. 3 (Jul., 1973), pp. 295–306.
 Michael Fellman. "Theodore Parker and the Abolitionist Role in the 1850s". The Journal of American History, Vol. 61, No. 3 (Dec., 1974), pp. 666–684.
 Anne Firor Scott. "Women's Perspective on the Patriarchy in the 1850s". The Journal of American History, Vol. 61, No. 1 (Jun., 1974), pp. 52–64.
 James P. Morris. "An American First: Blood Transfusion in New Orleans in the 1850s". Louisiana History: The Journal of the Louisiana Historical Association, Vol. 16, No. 4 (Autumn, 1975), pp. 341–360.
 Marshall Scott Legan. "Railroad Sentiment in North Louisiana in the 1850s". Louisiana History: The Journal of the Louisiana Historical Association, Vol. 17, No. 2 (Spring, 1976), pp. 125–142.
 Carl Abbott. "Indianapolis in the 1850s: Popular Economic Thought and Urban Growth". Indiana Magazine of History, Vol. 74, No. 4 (December 1978), pp. 293–315.
 Dale Baum. "Know-Nothingism and the Republican Majority in Massachusetts: The Political Realignment of the 1850s". The Journal of American History, Vol. 64, No. 4 (Mar., 1978), pp. 959–986.
 Susan Jackson. "Movin' On: Mobility through Houston in the 1850s". The Southwestern Historical Quarterly, Vol. 81, No. 3 (Jan., 1978), pp. 251–282.
 Matilda W. Rice. "The 4th of July in the 1850s". Minnesota History, Vol. 49, No. 2 (Summer, 1984), pp. 54–55.
 Lori D. Ginzberg. "Moral Suasion Is Moral Balderdash: Women, Politics, and Social Activism in the 1850s". The Journal of American History, Vol. 73, No. 3 (Dec., 1986), pp. 601–622.
 Carla L. Peterson. ""Capitalism, Black (Under)Development, and the Production of the African-American Novel in the 1850s". American Literary History, Vol. 4, No. 4 (Winter, 1992), pp. 559–583.
 Marius M. Carriere Jr. "Anti-Catholicism, Nativism, and Louisiana Politics in the 1850s". Louisiana History: The Journal of the Louisiana Historical Association, Vol. 35, No. 4 (Autumn, 1994), pp. 455–474.
 Vincent J. Bertolini. "Fireside Chastity: The Erotics of Sentimental Bachelorhood in the 1850s". American Literature, Vol. 68, No. 4 (Dec., 1996), pp. 707–737.
 Larry Knight. "The Cart War: Defining American in San Antonio in the 1850s". The Southwestern Historical Quarterly, Vol. 109, No. 3 (Jan., 2006), pp. 319–336.

External links

1820